Howard Keith Pritchard (born 18 October 1958, in Cardiff)  is a Welsh former professional footballer.  His clubs included Bristol City, Swindon Town and Gillingham, and he also made one appearance for the Welsh national team.

References

1958 births
Living people
Welsh footballers
Gillingham F.C. players
Bristol City F.C. players
Swindon Town F.C. players
Walsall F.C. players
Maidstone United F.C. (1897) players
Yeovil Town F.C. players
Yate Town F.C. players
Wales international footballers
Footballers from Cardiff
Association football wingers